Mount Peck, is a mountain in the Tower of London Range of the Muskwa Ranges of the Northern Canadian Rockies in British Columbia. 
Until 1987 it was named Mount Stalin, when its name was changed to recognize Don Peck, a trapper, guide and outfitter from the area. This renaming occurred as a result of the advocacy of Dr Lubomyr Luciuk and Dr Bohdan Kordan, with the support of the Ukrainian Canadian Civil Liberties Association.

References
Citations

Sources

Peck
Canadian Rockies
Northern Interior of British Columbia
De-Stalinization
Peace River Land District